Michał Szostak (born 1980), is an international concert organist, organologist, musicologist and researcher from Poland. A Doctor of Music Arts in organ performance, he studied organ performance at the Fryderyk Chopin Music University in Warsaw under Prof. Andrzej Chorosiński and organ improvisation at the Pontificio Istituto Ambrosiano di Musica Sacra in Milan under Maestro Davide Paleari as well as management (Master and PhD studies) at Leon Koźmiński Academy in Warsaw. As the first Pole, he received the certificate of The Royal College of Organists. He is a member of The American Guild of Organists and The Organ Historical Society.

He performs annually dozens organ recitals around the world: Argentina, Austria, Brasil, Canada, Chile, Czech Republic, Denmark, France, Germany, Italy, Kazakhstan, Nigeria, Panama, Poland, Slovakia, Ukraine, the United Kingdom and the USA.

He is an author of books (The Rebirth of a Giant, The Lichen Organ in Relation to the Largest Instruments in Poland, Europe and the World), chapters of books, post-conference publications and scientific articles in international organ magazines: British The Organ, American 'The Diapason' and The Vox Humana and dozens of international scientific journals. He has the widest international bibliography among the Polish scholars working in area of organ studies. His fields of scientific explorations are: instruments - their features and construction, historical tendencies in organ building, historical and contemporary performance practices, life and creation of important figures of music world. He is an author of many original approaches in scientific fields of organology, e.g.: methodology of the comparison of instruments according to their size, aesthetically oriented approach to the perception of organ music. In the years 2011-2018, he held the prestigious position of Music Director and the Leading Organist at the Shrine of the Virgin Mary in Licheń Stary where he played the largest organ in Poland (Zych, 157/6M+P) located in the Basilica in Licheń Stary (the largest church in Poland). In the years 2002-2011, he was the Music Director and the Leading Organist at the Our Lady of Lourdes church in Warsaw. 

He recorded on CDs (the largest organ in Poland in Lichen basilica: “Ave Regina Caelorum” with improvisations and French Inspirations: 2nd half of the 19th century with French repertoire and improvisations, Prague Impressions on the Petr organ in the church of St. Ignace in Prague, Czech Republic) released by L'Arte dell'Organo label, for radio broadcasts, TV and online platforms. He is an often guest of public broadcasts. He was an co-author of organological auditions in Radio 106,2. Since 2004 he has been the founder and president of the Jan Drzewoski Foundation.

He held a position of Associate Professor at the University of Social Sciences and Collegium Civitas in Warsaw, leading research in the field of art, creativity and management, as well as didactic activities at Bachelor, Master and MBA programmes (also in the international environment: at the Polish campus of the Clark University, at PRIGO University in the Czech Republic, VSEMS in Slovakia, University of Klaipeda in Lithuania).

Since the 2000s, he works in international business environment.

References

External links 
 Academia.edu page
Biography of the artist in the Polish Music Information Centre page
 Google scholar page
 Official YouTube channel
 Official webpage
ORCID page
ResearchGate

1980 births
Living people
Polish organists
Researchers in organizational studies